"I'm Still Gonna Need You" is a song performed by The Osmonds in 1975.  It is on their 1975 album, The Proud One.  Its B-side, "Thank You", is also on the album.  It reached No. 38 on the U.S. Adult Contemporary chart and No. 32 in  the U.K.

The mid-tempo ballad is sung primarily by Merrill Osmond and the other Osmond brothers filling in the various harmony parts during the chorus.

Charts

References

1975 songs
1975 singles
The Osmonds songs
MGM Records singles